The Men's Downhill in the 2017 FIS Alpine Skiing World Cup involved eight events, including the season finale in Aspen, Colorado (USA). Due to difficult weather conditions, only two downhills were held during the first twenty events of the 2016-17 World Cup season, meaning that six were held during the final sixteen events.  Defending discipline champion Peter Fill of Italy, who did not win a downhill all season, went into the finals trailing Norway's Kjetil Jansrud by 33 points, but he finished second in the finals (80 points) while Jansrud finished 11th (24 points), thus permitting Fill to repeat as downhill season champion by 23 points despite not recording a win.

The season was interrupted by the 2017 World Ski Championships, which were held from 6–20 February in St. Moritz, Switzerland. The men's downhill was scheduled to be held on 11 February but was delayed a day by poor visibility due to fog, finally being held on 12 February.

Standings

DNF = Did Not Finish
DNS = Did Not Start

See also
 2017 Alpine Skiing World Cup – Men's summary rankings
 2017 Alpine Skiing World Cup – Men's Overall
 2017 Alpine Skiing World Cup – Men's Super-G
 2017 Alpine Skiing World Cup – Men's Giant Slalom
 2017 Alpine Skiing World Cup – Men's Slalom
 2017 Alpine Skiing World Cup – Men's Combined
 World Cup scoring system

References

External links
 Alpine Skiing at FIS website

External links
 

Men's Downhill
FIS Alpine Ski World Cup men's downhill discipline titles